The Piano Concerto No. 2 in F minor, Op. 21, is a piano concerto composed by Frédéric Chopin in fall 1829.  Chopin composed the piece before he had finished his formal education, at around 20 years of age.  It was first performed on 17 March 1830, in Warsaw, Poland, with the composer as soloist.  It was the second of his piano concertos to be published (after the Piano Concerto No. 1), and so was designated as "No. 2", even though it was written first.

Structure 

The work contains the three movements typical of instrumental concertos of the period:

A typical performance lasts around 30 to 35 minutes.

Orchestration 
Chopin's fellow composers and Prof. Elsner's former students, Ignacy Feliks Dobrzyński (1807-1867) and Tomasz Nidecki (1807-1852), are believed to have helped him orchestrate his piano concertos.  This gave an excuse for other musicians to make slight alterations in the score.  
Alfred Cortot created his own orchestration of the F minor concerto and recorded it with the London Philharmonic Orchestra under John Barbirolli in 1935. Ingolf Wunder recorded Alfred Cortot's orchestration with minor changes done by himself in 2015. More recently (in 2017), Mikhail Pletnev recorded his arrangements of both of Chopin's piano concertos, conducting the Mahler Chamber Orchestra, with pianist Daniil Trifonov.

References 

 Ledbetter, Steven (1994). Pro Arte: Piano Concerto #2 in F minor.
 Bazzana, Kevin "Programme Notes".

External links 
 

Concertos by Frédéric Chopin
Chopin 2
1830 compositions
Compositions in F minor